The Classy 'N Smart Stakes is a Thoroughbred horse race run annually in mid October at Woodbine Racetrack in Toronto, Ontario, Canada. An Ontario Sire Stakes, it is a restricted race for fillies and mares, age three and older. It is contested over a distance of one and one-sixteenth miles (8.5 furlongs) on Polytrack synthetic dirt and currently carries a purse of $94,913.

Inaugurated in 1997, the race was named to honor Sam-Son Farm's Champion filly and Canadian Horse Racing Hall of Fame inductee, Classy 'n Smart.

Records
Speed  record: 
 1:42.53 - Strut the Course (2014)

Most wins:
 3 - Brass in Pocket (2002, 2003, 2004)

Most wins by an owner:
 3 - Frank Di Giulio, Jr.  (2002, 2003, 2004)

Most wins by a jockey:
 3- Todd Kabel (2001, 2002, 2004)

Most wins by a trainer:
 4 - Robert P. Tiller (2002, 2003, 2004, 2016)

Winners

References
 The Classy 'N Smart Stakes at Pedigree Query
 The 2008 Classy 'N Smart Stakes at Woodbine Entertainment

Ontario Sire Stakes
Ungraded stakes races in Canada
Mile category horse races for fillies and mares
Recurring sporting events established in 1997
Woodbine Racetrack